Old Yeller is a 1957 American drama western film directed by Robert Stevenson and produced by Walt Disney. It stars Dorothy McGuire and Fess Parker, with Tommy Kirk, and Kevin Corcoran. It is about a boy and a stray dog in post-Civil War Texas. The film is based upon the 1956 novel of the same name by Fred Gipson. Gipson also co-wrote the screenplay along with William Tunberg. The film's success led to a 1963 sequel, Savage Sam, which was based on a 1962 book by Gipson.

In 2019, the film was selected for preservation into the United States National Film Registry by the Library of Congress for being "culturally, historically, or aesthetically significant".

Plot 

In the late 1860s, Jim Coates leaves his family – wife Katie, teenage son Travis, and small son Arliss – to collect cattle in Kansas. While Jim is away, Travis sets off to work in the cornfield, where he encounters a Black Mouth Cur he names "Old Yeller", as "yeller" is a dialect pronunciation of "yellow" and the dog's bark resembles a human yell. Travis unsuccessfully tries to shoo the dog away, while Arliss defends him. Yeller's habit of stealing meat from smokehouses and robbing hens' nests does not endear him to Travis, but his mother agrees with the idea of Arliss having a dog.

Later, Arliss tries to capture a black bear cub by feeding it cornbread and grabbing it. Its angry mother hears her cub wailing and attacks, but Old Yeller frightens her away, winning over the family. Travis grows to love and respect Old Yeller, who comes to profoundly affect the boy's life.

Bud Searcy and his granddaughter Lisbeth come for supper one day, and Lisbeth takes Travis aside to tell him Old Yeller has been stealing food all over the county. After she and Bud leave, Travis scolds Old Yeller. The next day, Old Yeller proves himself as a cow dog by protecting Travis from Rose, their cow, and restraining her while Travis milks her.

One day, Old Yeller's original master, Burn Sanderson, arrives looking for his dog. Realizing that the Coates family really needs Old Yeller, he agrees to trade him to Arliss for a horny toad and a home-cooked meal. Sanderson later takes Travis aside and warns him of the growing plague of hydrophobia (rabies).

One day, Travis sets out to trap a family of feral hogs. Advised by Bud Searcy, he sits in a tree, trying to rope them from above as Old Yeller corners them. However, Travis then falls into the group of hogs and is attacked by one. Old Yeller defends Travis as he crawls away with an injured leg. However, Old Yeller is severely injured by the hog and Travis hides him in a large hole. Travis' mother then retrieves Old Yeller and uses mule hair to suture his wounds. As Old Yeller recovers, Searcy warns the Coates family of hydrophobia in the area but Katie chastises him for trying to scare Travis. Searcy leaves, and Lisbeth stays with the Coateses to help them harvest corn. Travis assures Katie that the hogs were not rabid, and both he and Old Yeller recover.

Later, the family sees their cow, Rose, stumbling and foaming at the mouth. Travis confirms that she is rabid and shoots her. While Katie and Lisbeth burn her body that night, a wolf suddenly attacks them. Katie's scream alerts Travis, who runs outside with a rifle, just in time to see Old Yeller fighting off the wolf. Travis successfully shoots the wolf, but not before it bites Old Yeller on the neck. Katie tells Travis that because no healthy wolf would attack near a burning area, the wolf was rabid. Katie then suggests shooting Old Yeller, but Travis insists that they instead pen him in the corn crib to see if he shows symptoms of the disease. After remaining quarantined, the Coateses believe that Old Yeller escaped infection. However, one night, when Travis goes to feed Old Yeller, he growls at him aggressively. Travis suspects that Old Yeller may have been infected but says nothing. Later that night, Arliss obliviously tries to open the corn crib to release Old Yeller. Katie slams the door shut as Old Yeller snarls and tries to attack. Katie then tells Travis that Old Yeller is suffering and returns Arliss to the house. Katie returns with the rifle, but Travis takes it, reluctantly shoots Old Yeller and departs.

Upset over his dog's death, Travis declines a new puppy sired by Old Yeller. Jim then returns with money and gifts for the family. Katie tells him about the dog, and Jim discusses it with Travis. Upon returning to the farmhouse, Travis observes the puppy stealing a piece of meat, a habit inherited from Old Yeller. Travis then accepts the puppy, "Young Yeller," as his new dog.

Cast

 Spike as Old Yeller
 Fess Parker as Jim Coates
 Dorothy McGuire as Katie Coates
 Tommy Kirk as Travis Coates
 Kevin Corcoran as Arliss Coates
 Jeff York as Bud Searcy
 Beverly Washburn as Lisbeth Searcy
 Chuck Connors as Burn Sanderson

Comic book adaptation
The film was adapted into a 1957 comic book published by Dell Comics. It was issue #869 of Four Color comic series, and was reprinted in 1965.

Reception

Box office
During its initial theatrical run, Old Yeller earned $5.9 million in box office rentals from the United States and Canada. The film was re-released in 1965, and earned an estimated $2 million in domestic rentals.

Critical reaction
Bosley Crowther of The New York Times praised the film's performers and called the film "a nice little family picture" that was a "lean and sensible screen transcription of Fred Gipson's children's book." He further described the film as a "warm, appealing little rustic tale [that] unfolds in lovely color photography. Sentimental, yes, but also sturdy as a hickory stick." Time magazine felt the "action, in short, is exciting for everybody, but all too often the dialogue is only for the very young." However, they heralded the film as being "for the kids that adults will stay to enjoy themselves. Old Yeller propounds a major tenet of Disney philosophy: a dog should be a dog, and a boy should act like a man."

Harrison's Reports wrote the film "is fine entertainment for all, even though it has a special appeal for the children." John L. Scott of the Los Angeles Times praised the two child actors for "their naturalness and ability", as well as Spike the dog, writing that he "may be well be the next movie star dog." In summary, he wrote that "[t]he production is not a great one; but it will bring families back to the theater."

Legacy
Old Yeller went on to become an important cultural film for baby boomers, with Old Yeller's death in particular being remembered as one of the most tearful scenes in cinematic history. On the review aggregator website Rotten Tomatoes, the film has an approval rating of 100% based on 22 reviews, with a weighted average of 8.20/10. The critical consensus reads: "Old Yeller is an exemplary coming of age tale, packing an emotional wallop through smart pacing and a keen understanding of the elemental bonding between humanity and their furry best friends." One critic cited it as "among the best, if not THE best" of the boy-and-his-dog films. Critic Jeff Walls wrote:

Old Yeller, like The Wizard of Oz and Star Wars, has come to be more than just a movie; it has become a part of our culture. If you were to walk around asking random people, you would be hard-pressed to find someone who did not know the story of Old Yeller, someone who didn't enjoy it or someone who didn't cry. The movie's ending has become as famous as any other in film history.

See also
 List of American films of 1957
 Savage Sam

References

External links

 
 
 
 

1957 films
1957 drama films
American adventure drama films
American children's drama films
American Western (genre) films
1957 Western (genre) films
Films about euthanasia
American coming-of-age films
1950s English-language films
Animal adventure films
Films about dogs
Films adapted into comics
Films based on American novels
Films based on children's books
Films directed by Robert Stevenson
Films produced by Bill Anderson (producer)
Films produced by Walt Disney
Films set in Texas
Films set in the 1860s
Films scored by Oliver Wallace
Rabies in popular culture
United States National Film Registry films
Walt Disney Pictures films
1950s American films